Ambepussa Army Camp is a military base located in Ambepussa, the Western Province, Gamapaha District of Sri Lanka. It serves as the regimental headquarters of the Sinha Regiment of Sri Lanka Army.

See also
Sri Lanka Sinha Regiment

References

Sri Lankan Army bases
Buildings and structures in Sri Lanka